Luke Ronchi (born 23 April 1981) is a New Zealand-Australian cricket coach and a former cricketer. He represented both the Australia national cricket team and New Zealand national cricket team in international cricket. Ronchi is the only player to have played for both Australia and New Zealand in cricketing history and was part of the New Zealand World Cup side that finished runners-up in the 2015 Cricket World Cup, after their defeat in the final to Australia. He played for Wellington in New Zealand domestic matches and has played Twenty20 matches for a range of sides. He retired from international cricket in June 2017.

Born in Dannevirke in the Manawatū-Whanganui region of New Zealand, Ronchi emigrated to Perth, Western Australia, with his family at an early age. He was educated at Kent Street Senior High School. He is an aggressive batsman and fields as a wicket-keeper. He debuted for Western Australia in January 2002. After a period as second-choice wicket-keeper behind Ryan Campbell, Ronchi became Western Australia's first-choice keeper after Campbell's retirement in 2006. For a period of time between 2007 and 2009, he served as Australia's second-choice keeper behind Brad Haddin, and played several matches for Australia A.

After Haddin broke his finger during the national team's 2008 tour of the West Indies, Ronchi played one Twenty20 International (T20I) and four One-Day International (ODI) matches, and later played two further Twenty20 International matches against the touring South African team in 2009. In February 2012, Ronchi announced his intention to return to New Zealand to further his cricketing career, and signed with the Wellington cricket team the following month. He made his ODI debut for New Zealand in May 2013, becoming the first player to play for both Australia and New Zealand at international level.

Ronchi made his Test debut for New Zealand in May 2015 against England scoring 88 off 70 balls. Ronchi's first innings runs were critical in propping up New Zealand after a shaky start on an overcast morning in Leeds. New Zealand won the match in only their fifth win in England and their first in nearly 30 years on English soil.

Ronchi announced his retirement from international cricket on 21 June 2017. Former New Zealand captain Brendon McCullum, under whom Ronchi spent most of his career playing under, described Ronchi as someone who, "embodied all that is important about the Black Caps culture. Selfless, respectful, humble and hard working."

Domestic career

Ronchi is well known for his ability to score runs quickly and on 7 February 2007 he broke the record for the fastest domestic one-day hundred in Australian cricket. Opening the batting against New South Wales, Ronchi scored his maiden one-day ton off only 56 deliveries, beating the previous record held by fellow West Australian Adam Voges of 62 deliveries. When dismissed, he had scored 105 runs from just 64 balls and easily guided Western Australia to an 8-wicket victory over New South Wales.

Ronchi began the 2007–08 season in strong fashion. Proving that he is in the Australian selectors minds for the future, Ronchi was chosen as Australia A wicketkeeper for their tour of Pakistan. In the second first-class match of the tour, Ronchi scored a blistering 107 off 109 balls, striking 16 fours and 2 sixes. His good form continued into the Australian Domestic season, as he scored 104 against New South Wales in Western Australia's first List A match of the season.

In November 2007 Ronchi scored one of the fastest centuries in Australian Domestic history with a ton from 51 balls against Queensland. Ronchi struck 11 sixes in his innings of 105* with his second fifty coming from just 11 balls.

Ronchi was also recruited by the Mumbai Indians team in 2007, one of the eight Indian Premier League (IPL) franchises. He played five matches for the team, spread throughout the 2008 and 2009 tournaments, scoring a total of 34 runs at an average of 6.80.

International career

Australia
In April 2008, Cricket Australia named Brad Haddin as the only wicketkeeper in its list of 25 contracted players, overlooking Ronchi. Despite failing to receive a contract, Ronchi was called up to the Australian team in June 2008 during their tour of the West Indies when Haddin was unable to play after breaking his finger.  After making his international debut in the tour's Twenty20 match (scoring 36 from 22 balls opening the batting with fellow West Australian on international debut, Shaun Marsh), he was not required to bat in his first two ODI matches. 

In the final game of the series, he was elevated up the batting order to number three and batted very well to record the equal second fastest fifty by an Australian on his way to scoring 64 from 28 balls, including six sixes and was awarded the player of the match award (later in the same match David Hussey scored an even faster fifty relegating Ronchi's innings to equal third fastest).

Ronchi made his debut on home soil in a Twenty20 match at the Melbourne Cricket Ground (MCG) against the South Africans as wicketkeeper when Haddin was rested from the team.

New Zealand

In February 2012, Ronchi announced his intention to return to New Zealand in an attempt to qualify for the national team. He signed with Wellington in March 2012, and made his Plunket Shield debut on 18 March against Central Districts, scoring a century, 111, on debut for the team.

In April 2013, Ronchi was selected by the New Zealand cricket board as part of the limited-overs squad for the New Zealand tour of England the following month. He made his debut for the team on 31 May 2013 at Lord's, scoring a duck and taking three catches. He thus became the first player to play international cricket for both Australia and New Zealand, 8th player in ODI history and the first since Kepler Wessels (Australia and South Africa) in the 1980s to play for two full members of the International Cricket Council (ICC).

In January 2015, Ronchi hit an unbeaten 170 off 99 balls against Sri Lanka at University Oval in Dunedin. This was the highest by a batsman batting seventh or lower in ODIs, and also the third-highest score by a wicket-keeper, behind MS Dhoni's 183 not out and Adam Gilchrist's 172. Ronchi is also the only batsman to have scored a 150 in an ODI innings when batting at number 7 position or lower.

Ronchi along with Grant Elliott set the highest ever record stand of 267 not out for the sixth wicket in ODI history.

During the 2017 ICC Champions Trophy, in what was to be his final international matches, Ronchi played as an opening wicket-keeper-batsman. On 22 June, he announced his retirement from international cricket, and will be available in domestic cricket for Wellington and Leicestershire.

Post international retirement
Following his international retirement, Ronchi signed for Leicestershire County Cricket Club to play in the 2017 NatWest t20 Blast. He enjoyed a successful tournament racking up 429 runs at a strike rate of 180.25 as an opener and scored three half-centuries, including a 16-ball 50 against Durham, the third fastest half-century in English T20 history. In the 2018 Pakistan Super League, Ronchi scored a half-century off 19 balls for Islamabad United, the second fastest in the history of the Pakistan Super League.

In June 2018, he was drafted by Edmonton Royals to play in the inaugural edition of the Global T20 Canada tournament and in September 2018 was named in Kabul's squad in the first edition of the Afghanistan Premier League tournament. In October he was drafted by Chittagong Vikings for the 2018–19 Bangladesh Premier League.

In July 2019, he was selected to play for the Rotterdam Rhinos in the inaugural edition of the Euro T20 Slam cricket tournament. However, the following month the tournament was cancelled.

Coaching career
In April 2019, he was also appointed as fielding and wicketkeeping coach for New Zealand until the end of 2019 Cricket World Cup.

See also
List of cricketers who have played for two international teams

References

External links
 

1981 births
Living people
Australia One Day International cricketers
Australia Twenty20 International cricketers
Australian cricket coaches
Australian cricketers
Chattogram Challengers cricketers
Cricketers at the 2015 Cricket World Cup
Cricketers from Dannevirke
Dual international cricketers
Guyana Amazon Warriors cricketers
Hampshire Cricket Board cricketers
Islamabad United cricketers
Kabul Zwanan cricketers
Leicestershire cricketers
Mumbai Indians cricketers
New Zealand cricket coaches
New Zealand cricketers
New Zealand emigrants to Australia
New Zealand One Day International cricketers
New Zealand Test cricketers
New Zealand Twenty20 International cricketers
North Island cricketers
People educated at Kent Street Senior High School
Perth Scorchers cricketers
Somerset cricketers
Warwickshire cricketers
Wellington cricketers
Western Australia cricketers
World XI Twenty20 International cricketers